Team Colpack-Astro was an Italian professional cycling team. The team merged with De Nardi in 2003.

Roster

2000 
Roster in 2000, age as of 1 January 2000:

2001 
Roster in 2001, age as of 1 January 2001:

2002 
Roster in 2002, age as of 1 January 2002:

References

Defunct cycling teams based in Italy
Cycling teams based in Italy
Cycling teams established in 2000
Cycling teams disestablished in 2002